Luiz Fernando Pereira da Silva (born 25 November 1985), commonly known as Fernandinho, is a Brazilian professional footballer who plays as a winger for Chongqing Lifan.

Club career
On 28 February 2010, he became the São Paulo's striker by assisting 4 goals on his debut, in only 45 minutes. At the age of 5 he was recognised as one of Brazil's future stars. Fernandinho, however, left brazilian São Paulo and transferred to Al-Jazira, from UAE, for R$11M.

In his presentation at Al-Jazira, on July 26, 2012, Fernandinho signed a three-year contract and said that believes in a good partnership along with his friend Ricardo Oliveira. It was confirmed that he will wear the nº12 shirt, previously worn by Sami Rubaiya.

On 7 August 2013, Fernandinho was contracted to Atlético Mineiro and, consequently, came back to Brazilian football. He signed a one-year contract and is one of main players to 2013 FIFA Club World Cup for Galo after Bernard's selling to Ukrainian football. As Fernandinho is linked to Desportivo Brasil, his contraction, even after closing of international window, could be considered a national one.

On 9 July 2014, Fernandinho was transferred from Al-Jazira by €2 million to Grêmio.

On 3 January 2018, Fernandinho joined Chinese Super League side Chongqing Lifan on a free transfer.

Career statistics

Honours

Club
Grêmio Barueri
 Campeonato Paulista do Interior: 2008

Grêmio
Copa Libertadores: 2017

Individual
 Campeonato Brasileiro Série A Best Newcomer: 2009

References

External links

Fernandinho profile. Portal Oficial do Grêmio.

1985 births
Living people
Footballers from São Paulo (state)
Brazilian footballers
Ferroviário Atlético Clube (CE) players
Iraty Sport Club players
Grêmio Barueri Futebol players
São Paulo FC players
Al Jazira Club players
Clube Atlético Mineiro players
Grêmio Foot-Ball Porto Alegrense players
Campeonato Brasileiro Série A players
Daejeon Hana Citizen FC players
Citizen AA players
UAE Pro League players
Hellas Verona F.C. players
Chongqing Liangjiang Athletic F.C. players
K League 1 players
Serie A players
Chinese Super League players
Brazilian expatriate footballers
Expatriate footballers in South Korea
Expatriate footballers in Hong Kong
Expatriate footballers in the United Arab Emirates
Expatriate footballers in Italy
Expatriate footballers in China
Brazilian expatriate sportspeople in Hong Kong
Brazilian expatriate sportspeople in China
Association football forwards
Association football midfielders